Who Makes Me Crazy is a 1995 South Korean romantic comedy film starring Lee Byung-hun and Choi Jin-sil.

Plot
Kim Jong-du, a salesman who  believes that luck will change when he becomes a famous writer. However he is forced to give up after his story failed to win at a spring literature contest. Added to this is the fear that his girlfriend Joo-young will leave him. After Joo-young gets a job Jong-du realizes his mistakes that knows that she will never leave him.

Cast
Lee Byung-hun as Kim Jong-du  
Choi Jin-sil as Joo-young 
Choi Jong-won
Kim Il-woo 
Kwon Byung-gil 
Cho Seon-mook 
Choi Hak-rak 
Kim Ye-ryeong as Min Ji-hyun
Cho Ju-mi 
Lim Dae-ho

External links
 
 

1995 romantic comedy films
1995 films
South Korean romantic comedy films
1990s Korean-language films